Swedish Curling Hall of Fame was created in 1966 by the Swedish Curling Association. A number of former and currently played curlers are inducted every year.

Members

Members of Swedish Curling Hall of Fame denoted in men's and women's lists of Swedish curlers with "SG: + number + year/season" (for example for Claes Källén "SG: nr 18 1970-71").

References

Curling in Sweden
Curling trophies and awards
Halls of fame in Sweden
Sports halls of fame
1966 establishments in Sweden
Awards established in 1966